Suncoast Technical Education Center is a public technical school in Brooksville, Florida. It is a joint venture between the Hernando County School District and the office of business development. It serves students 16 and older and is located in Nature Coast Technical High School.

References

External links
 Official website

Brooksville, Florida
Education in Hernando County, Florida
Vocational education in the United States